The District of Athabasca was a regional administrative district of Canada's Northwest Territories. It was formed in 1882, was later enlarged, and then abolished with the creation of the provinces of Saskatchewan (its central-eastern part) and Alberta (western part) in 1905. The very easternmost part is now within Manitoba.

Boundaries
Its northern boundary was the current southern boundary of the Northwest Territories and the western part met the boundary of British Columbia. In 1882 it included most of the northern portion of the modern-day Province of Alberta. On the south, its boundary with the District of Alberta was the 18th correction line, approximately 55° north, now designated Township Road 710.

In 1895 it was expanded east to include the northern portion of the modern-day Province of Saskatchewan and part of northwestern modern-day Manitoba, and the southern boundary was moved northward.

See also
Territorial evolution of Canada
District of Alberta
District of Assiniboia
District of Saskatchewan

References

Regions of Canada
Districts of the Northwest Territories